Ras Beirut ("Tip of Beirut") is an upscale residential neighborhood in Beirut. It has a mixed population of Christians, Muslims, Druze, and secular individuals. Ras Beirut is home to some of Beirut's historically prominent families, such as the Bekhazi Rebeiz family, the Daouk family, the Itani family, the Sinno family, and the Sidani family family, the Beyhum family and others. Included in the area are a number of international schools and universities, including the American University of Beirut (AUB) and International College Beirut (IC).

Archaeology 
In 1946, Henri Fleisch from Saint Joseph University made an unstratified, open-air survey of the marine terraces of Ras Beirut recovering various artifacts. Flints have also been recovered by walkers on the nearby beaches. The area is separated from the Sands of Beirut sites by the Wadi Abu Chahine or "South Creek" which begins south of the Continental Hotel area. It is an important site for Quaternary studies and has been published in various works by Fleisch, Auguste Bergy in 1932, L. Dubertret in 1940 and 1948, Wright in 1960 and 1962, Raoul Describes in 1921, Dorothy Garrod in 1960 and R. Neuville in 1933. Stratified sites are numbered in chronological order with unstratified sites at the end. The first four sites contain stratified Lower Paleolithic industries from the  beach level, the next five are stratified Middle Paleolithic with a gap in stratified sites to the Chalcolithic found at site XI. Intervening periods including the Levalloiso-Mousterian were well represented in surface finds along with a substantial amount of Neolithic material on a  terrace. Collections are held in the American University of Beirut and the Museum of Lebanese Prehistory. Many of the sites have been built on and completely destroyed by urbanisation.
It was found by Henri Fleisch and published in 1946, 1956 and 1960 along with Howell in 1959 and Garrod in 1962 and 1965. An Early Acheulean or Abbevillian rolled biface was found by Fleisch in the breccia above Rue Jinnah that predates all of the other tools found at Ras Beirut. An abundant Middle Acheulean industry was also found.

Ras Beirut II or The Offshore Bar is a fossil bar of flint, gravel and marine organisms,  under the soil next to and under Rue Jinnah. It was studied by Henri Fleisch during the digging of a drainage trench who published results in 1951 and 1954. It is also mentioned by Howell in 1959 and Dorothy Garrod in 1960. Numerous pieces with no bifaces were found and considered to be Tayacian with some Levallois influence. The site possibly still exists under the road.

Ras Beirut III or Depots A. and B. is northeast of Rue Jinnah and was again found by Father Fleisch who published his studies in 1950 and 1956. Depot A contained an Early Levallois industry with bifaces and a type of pick resembling Bir Hassan picks.

The site was found by Auguste Bergy and published in 1932. Henri Fleisch also studied the area with and published some new discoveries in 1956. Early Levalloisian industries were found including bifacial Bir Hassan picks in the  layer on the bedrock. Larger flint flakes were found in the  layer above this. Fleisch recovered more of the earlier type of industry when the Corniche Road was widened and is suggested to still exist under a side road that leads to the Federal Hotel.

A layer of pebbles, marine shells and flints in the sandstone was found by Auguste Bergy and studied by Dubertret in 1937 and 1940, de Vaumas in 1947, Haller in 1945, Fleisch in 1956 and 1962, Howell in 1959 and Dorothy Garrod in 1960. Levalloisian materials are more evolved at this site and a Micro-Levalloisian series of tools were also found.

It was discovered by Henri Fleisch and published in 1956. Two varieties of Levalloisian were found, one with finely produced thin flakes, the other with coarse thick ones. A Micro-Levalloisian industry accompanied it.

A Micro-Levalloisian industry was found by Henri Fleisch and published in 1948 and 1956 dating to the time when the  sea level regressed.

Ras Beirut VII  or South Creek is on the west side of the Corniche road, west of the Continental Hotel where the Wadi Abu Chahine drops to sea level. Fleisch found Levalloisian and Micro-Levalloisian industries in the upper layers. The site has now disappeared.

Ras Beirut VIII or Bay of Pigeon Rock is in a gully on the south cliff in the Bay of Pigeon Rock. Material was recovered in brecciated beach deposits representing a Levalloisian industry with traces of Micro-Levalloisian, this was studied by Fleisch and published in 1954 and 1956.

The material is suggested to date to the time when the sea had retreated from the  level and consists of a Levalloisian industry with Mousterian influence with large, thin flakes. Some Micro-Levalloisian pieces were also found.

Ras Beirut X or Bain Militaire was originally called Sud Phare by its discoverer, Auguste Bergy. Material was suggested to be of the Levallois form with some Bir Hassan picks similar to those at Ras Beirut III and IV but from a different level.

Neuville and Haller studied the site and materials again in 1933, reclassifying it as Chalcolithic with a lower Middle Paleolithic level along with an intervening later that Describes had missed. Jacques Cauvin has compared it with the Énéolithique Ancien period at Byblos suggested to date between 3800 and 3650 BCE. These were first observed by Dawson in 1884 and later by Godefroy Zumoffen in 1910, The industry includes javelins, borers, picks and assorted other tools. It has been described by Lorraine Copeland and Peter Wescombe as "probably the richest factory site in Lebanon" with hundreds of pieces recovered and held in the National Museum of Beirut.

Ras Beirut XII is thought to be in the area below the lighthouse and was found by Describes. It is recorded as a surface Acheulean site but appears to be a group of Neolithic pick along with factory waste. Construction of a playing field has covered the site with a false layer.

Ras Beirut XIII or Field south of Pigeon Rock is a cultivated field on the headland south of Pigeon rock where a surface site was found by Auguste Bergy and published in 1932. The Levallois industry is nicknamed Golden Mousterian due to it having a yellow or gold colour and sheen. Forms include large, broad flakes along with medium-sized points and blades with many pieces having traces of concretion.

Ras Beirut XIV or AUB Campus is part of the Ras Beirut station within the grounds of the American University of Beirut discussed by Zumoffen where thick, white Middle Paleolithic flakes were found on the slopes above the  terrace that have now been turned into a playing field next to International College Steps. Some Golden Mousterian pieces were found further down the slope.

Notable families from Ras Beirut 
 Ayass Family
 Chatila Family
 Daouk Family
 Itani Family
 Yamout Family
 Takkoush Family
 Bekhazi Family
 Rebeiz Family
 Sinno family
 Labban family

Streets
Bliss Street
Rue Clémenceau
Rue Madame Curie
Avenue General de Gaulle
Hamra Street
Rue Jeanne d'Arc
Rue John Kennedy
Avenue de Paris
Rue de Phénicie
Rue George Post
Rue Van Dyck
Corniche Beirut

References

Neolithic settlements
Archaeological sites in Lebanon
Neighbourhoods of Beirut